Megalonotus is a genus of dirt-colored seed bugs in the family Rhyparochromidae. There are at least 20 described species in Megalonotus.

Species
These 27 species belong to the genus Megalonotus:

 Megalonotus antennatus (Schilling, 1829) c g
 Megalonotus brevicornis (Puton, A., 1883) c g
 Megalonotus chiragrus (Thomson, 1870) i c g
 Megalonotus colon Puton, A., 1874 c g
 Megalonotus dilatatus (Herrich-Schaeffer, 1840) c g
 Megalonotus dilitatus (Herrich-Schaeffer, 1840) g
 Megalonotus emarginatus (Rey, C., 1888) c g
 Megalonotus hirsutus Fieber, F.X., 1861 c g
 Megalonotus lederi (Horvath, G., 1880) c g
 Megalonotus longipilus (Puton, A., 1884) c g
 Megalonotus maximus (Puton, A. & Noualhier, 1895) c g
 Megalonotus merus Seidendstucker, 1979 c g
 Megalonotus mixtus (Horvath, G., 1887) c g
 Megalonotus nitidicollis Puton, A., 1874 c g
 Megalonotus opaconotum (Lindberg, H., 1953) c g
 Megalonotus parallelus (Horvath, G., 1911) c g
 Megalonotus praetextatus (Herrich-Schaeffer, G.H.W., 1850) c g
 Megalonotus puncticollis (Lucas, 1849) c g
 Megalonotus rugulosus (Linnavuori, R., 1953) c g
 Megalonotus sabulicola (Thomson, 1870) i b
 Megalonotus sabulicolus (Thomson, 1870) c g
 Megalonotus scaurus Seidenstucker, 1973 c g
 Megalonotus semela Linnavuori, 1970 c g
 Megalonotus setosus Puton, A., 1874 c g
 Megalonotus sophenus Seidenstucker, 1973 c g
 Megalonotus subtilissimus Roubal, 1961 g
 Megalonotus tricolor (Horvath, G., 1895) c g

Data sources: i = ITIS, c = Catalogue of Life, g = GBIF, b = Bugguide.net

References

External links

 

Rhyparochromidae
Articles created by Qbugbot